Choi Seou (formerly Choi Yong-jik; born December 3, 1982) is a South Korean ski jumper who has been competing since 1998. Competing in six Winter Olympics, he earned his best finish of eighth in the team large hill event at Salt Lake City in 2002 Winter Olympics and his best individual finish of 34th in the individual normal hill event at those same games.

Choi's best finish at the FIS Nordic World Ski Championships was tenth in the team normal hill event at Oberstdorf in 2005 while his best individual finish was 22nd in the individual normal hill events at those same championships. He finished 29th in the individual event of the FIS Ski-Flying World Championships 2000 in Vikersund.

Choi's best individual World Cup finish was 25th in an individual large hill event in Germany in 2007.

He changed his name Choi Yong-jik to Choi Seou in 2011.

References

1982 births
Living people
Olympic ski jumpers of South Korea
Ski jumpers at the 1998 Winter Olympics
Ski jumpers at the 2002 Winter Olympics
Ski jumpers at the 2006 Winter Olympics
Ski jumpers at the 2010 Winter Olympics
Ski jumpers at the 2014 Winter Olympics
Ski jumpers at the 2018 Winter Olympics
South Korean male ski jumpers
Asian Games medalists in ski jumping
Ski jumpers at the 2003 Asian Winter Games
Ski jumpers at the 2011 Asian Winter Games
Ski jumpers at the 2017 Asian Winter Games
Korea National Sport University alumni
Asian Games gold medalists for South Korea
Asian Games bronze medalists for South Korea
Medalists at the 2003 Asian Winter Games
Medalists at the 2011 Asian Winter Games
Medalists at the 2017 Asian Winter Games
Universiade gold medalists for South Korea
Universiade silver medalists for South Korea
Universiade medalists in ski jumping
Medalists at the 2003 Winter Universiade
Ski jumpers at the 2007 Winter Universiade
Competitors at the 2009 Winter Universiade
20th-century South Korean people
21st-century South Korean people